Michael or Mike Marsh may refer to:

 Michael Marsh (sprinter) (born 1967), US-American sprinter and Olympic champion
 Michael Marsh (journalist), television news anchor on WBRZ-TV
 Mike Marsh (footballer) (born 1969), former Liverpool and Southend footballer
 Mike Marsh (musician) (born 1974), drummer of the band Dashboard Confessional
 Mike Marsh, a member of the New Hampshire House of Representatives
 Michael Newton Marsh, British professor